Emmanuel Marie Pierre Martin Jacquin de Margerie ForMemRS (11 November 1862 – 20 December 1953) was a French geographer after whom the Margerie Glacier was named, which he visited in 1913.

Awards and honours
Margerie was awarded the Cullum Geographical Medal of the American Geographical Society in 1919. In 1923 de Margerie was awarded the Mary Clark Thompson Medal from the National Academy of Sciences.

The Margerie Glacier is named in his honour.

References

1862 births
1953 deaths
French geographers
Recipients of the Cullum Geographical Medal
Lyell Medal winners
Wollaston Medal winners
Members of the French Academy of Sciences
Foreign Members of the Royal Society
Victoria Medal recipients